Camouflage Pantera has become the standard camouflage of the Polish Armed Forces. It is the successor of Camouflage wz. 89 Puma, and entered service in 1993. It differs from Puma in having stronger contrast, resulting in better disruptive camouflage.

History

Camouflage wz. 93 Pantera was created for JW GROM. In the middle of the 1990s, Pantera was introduced for all branches of the Polish Armed Forces, after Lech Wałęsa appeared with GROM's camouflage on military trainings.

Pantera was first used in combat by UNPROFOR during the Yugoslav wars.

At the beginning of the 21st century, because of the involvement of the Polish Armed Forces in international operations in deserts, it was decided to introduce a desert version of Pantera. This has identically shaped marks but different colors.

In Pantera military uniform there are also in production individual equipments for soldiers, for example: bulletproof vests and bags.

References

Camouflage patterns
Military camouflage
Military equipment introduced in the 1990s